Kohl may refer to:

Kohl (cosmetics), an ancient eye cosmetic
Kohl (surname), including a list of people with the surname
Kohl's, an American department store retail chain
KOHL,  a radio station in Fremont, California, United States
Kohl Children's Museum in Glenview, Illinois, United States

See also

Kohol (disambiguation)
Kohl v. United States, a U.S. Supreme Court case